The 4th Space Warning Squadron is an active United States Air Force Reserve Command unit, formerly located at Holloman Air Force Base, New Mexico, and now located at Buckley Space Force Base. The unit was activated on August 3, 2019. It was previously activated in May 1992 as the 4th Space Communications Squadron, when it took over the mission and personnel of the 4th Satellite Communications Squadron, before being inactivated in March 1996. The squadron's primary mission is to provide mobile Defense Support Program support in case of hostilities.

Mission
The squadron provided worldwide missile warning, space launch and detection in the event of an attack against the United States.

History
The 4th Space Warning Squadron  was activated on 15 May 1992, when it took over the mobile Defense Support Program (DSP) satellite mission which had been performed since 1983 at Holloman Air Force Base, New Mexico by the 1025th Satellite Communications Squadron, Mobile and the 4th Satellite Communications Squadron, Mobile.

The squadron employed the Air Force's only strategic survivable, mobile ground system to receive early warning missile attack data. The 4th provided survivable and endurable missile warning detection to the National Command Authority and had the ability to survive and operate through all phases of trans/post attack. Unlike fixed units, the 4th was designed to be mobile, and could deploy to any location in the world. In addition, the DSP satellites provided immediate, worldwide missile warning, space launch, and nuclear detonation detection.

The squadron mission was transferred to the 137th Space Warning Squadron of the Colorado Air National Guard in Greeley, Colorado in fall 1997.

Lineage
 Constituted as the 4th Space Communications Squadron on 1 May 1992
 Activated on 15 May 1992
 Redesignated 4th Space Warning Squadron on 16 October 1992
 Inactivated c. 30 September 1997
 Activated on 3 August 2019

Assignments
310th Space Wing, 3 August 2019 - present
21st Space Wing, 15 May 1992 – c. 30 September 1997

Stations
 Buckley Space Force Base, Colorado, 3 August 2019 - present
 Holloman Air Force Base, New Mexico, 15 May 1992 – c. 30 September 1997

Commanders
Lt Col Donald P. Knight (c. 1996)

Awards and campaigns

References

Notes
 Explanatory notes

 Citations

Bibliography

External links
49th Fighter Wing Public Affairs: Holloman AFB Homepage

Space Warning 0004
Military units and formations established in 1992
Military units and formations disestablished in 1997
Military units and formations established in 2019